Millicom International Cellular SA (NASDAQ U.S.: TIGO, NASDAQ Stockholm: TIGO_SDB) is a Luxembourgish fixed line and mobile telecommunications services provider dedicated to emerging markets in Latin America operating under the Tigo brand. As of December 31, 2020, Millicom operating subsidiaries and joint ventures employed more than 21,000 people and provided mobile services to approximately 55 million customers, with a cable footprint of more than 12 million homes passed.

History 

Millicom International Cellular SA was established on December 14, 1990, by Shelby Bryan, Jan Stenbeck, Telma Sosa, and Olvin Galdamez, combining the cellular telephone properties owned by Industriförvaltnings AB Kinnevik and Millicom Incorporated. Millicom is headquartered in Luxembourg with a United States corporate office in Miami. Through the Tigo and Tigo Business brands, Millicom provides digital services, including high-speed data, broadband, mobile, cable TV, voice and SMS, Mobile Financial Services, and business communications. Millicom operates in nine Latin American markets, including Bolivia, Colombia, Costa Rica, El Salvador, Guatemala, Honduras, Nicaragua, Panama and Paraguay.

After two years of planning, the company began operations when the founders completed a $131,000 share purchase in May 1982. The firm took over paging company Meta Systems in October 1982 and then raised $9 million in its first round of financing, managed by chief executive officer, Orhan Sadik-Khan and Kevin Kimberlin. Since 92% of the world population had no phone service at the time, Millicom promoted mobile technology on a global basis. To do this, Millicom created joint-ventures with local and strategic partners. On 13 December 1982, a joint-venture with Racal Electronics was awarded a cellular license for the United Kingdom. To enable Millicom to earn its 10% royalty from Racal-Millicom, a controlling shareholder, Stenbeck commissioned a startup with three employees, Technophone, to develop the world's first pocket-sized mobile phone. Highlighting its plans to offer the Voice and Data phone (predecessor to the smartphone), his Racal-Millicom joint-venture was renamed Vodafone.

On 12 October 1983, Millicom Inc. created China Telecom Systems (HK), a joint-venture with partners China Resources Ltd. and Comvik, a Swedish mobile firm also controlled by Jan Stenbeck. China Telecom Systems (HK) held the first cellular telephone contract in China, making its service available to the public on 20 May 1985. In December 1989, Millicom set up Microtel Communications Ltd. by teaming up with Pacific Telesis and British Aerospace (later bought out by Hutchison Telecom.) Microtel was awarded a personal communication network (PCN) license to compete with Vodafone in the United Kingdom, a service launched on 28 April 1994 under its brand name, Orange. This venture was acquired in October 1999, at which time Orange and its new parent, Mannesmann, were in turn both taken over by Vodafone. At a value of $202 billion, the takeover of Mannesmann by Vodafone was the largest transaction in corporate history. Orange (formerly Microtel) was then sold to France Telecom, which subsequently changed its corporate name to Orange.

To better manage their respective mobile interests, Millicom Inc. combined with Comvik's international cellular operations to become Millicom International Cellular SA in 1990, which now operates under the laws of the Grand Duchy of Luxembourg. In 2000, Millicom started investing in three continents: Asia, Africa, and Latin America. In 2004, Millicom conceptualized the TIGO brand. In 2008, Millicom acquired AMNET for fixed Internet and TV services, leading to the company's formal cable business entrance. Millicom completed the sale of its Asian business segment in 2011 with the sale of Laos. It previously operated in Cambodia, India, Indonesia, Pakistan, Philippines, Sri Lanka, and Vietnam. With the sale of its last remaining Asian operation, Millicom shifted its focus to Latin America and Africa.

Millicom launched its first 4G high-speed internet services in Colombia in 2014, followed by Bolivia later in the year, and the remaining markets soon after. In 2014, Millicom launched the TIGO Sports Television channel in Paraguay and Bolivia.

In 2012, Millicom partnered with UNICEF to protect children's rights, later renewing the partnership in 2020 to cover child online protection, and as virtual education gained prominence during the COVID-19 global pandemic.  In 2016, Millicom partnered with Microsoft to provide cloud services to its Tigo Business customers in eight markets in Latin America. In 2017, Millicom launched TIGO ONEtv, the first Next Generation TV (NGTV) service for LATAM customers, integrating traditional linear television content with over-the-top platforms, as well as video on-demand. In 2018, Millicom acquired Cable Onda in Panama.  In 2019, Millicom expanded its Latin American presence, acquiring subsidiaries of Telefónica in Central America (Panama and Nicaragua). In addition, in 2019, Millicom common shares started trading on the NASDAQ Stock Market in the United States under the symbol TIGO. The new listing complemented the company's existing Swedish Depository Receipt (SDR) listing on NASDAQ Stockholm.

In October 2020, Millicom became the first mobile operator in Latin America to introduce Amazon Prime Video Mobile Edition.

In April 2021, Millicom partnered with Amazon Web Services to expand and integrate its managed and professional services into its cloud services portfolio in Guatemala, El Salvador, Honduras, Nicaragua, Costa Rica, Panama, and Colombia.

That same month, Millicom announced the sale of its operations in Tanzania and for its stake in the AirtelTigo joint venture in Ghana, completing its multi-year plan to divest its African operations and focus on its Latin American markets.

Latin America

Guatemala 
Millicom has operated in Guatemala since 1990. It owns a 100% equity interest in the operation after acquiring the remaining 45% stake from its local joint venture partner in an $2.2 billion deal in November 2021. The Tigo brand launched in 2004, replacing former national brands COMCEL and Amigo de COMCEL. Tigo Guatemala is the country's largest mobile operator with more than nine million customers and market share of 53.4 percent. Mobile penetration is estimated at 112 percent (as measured by GSMA, 2017) with internet penetration at 27 percent (World Bank, 2015). Tigo also provides mobile financial services through Tigo Money, as well as broadband, cable and business Services.

El Salvador 
Millicom provides mobile and cable and other fixed services in El Salvador through Telemovil, which is wholly owned by Millicom. Tigo El Salvador has operated in the country since 1993. It is now the country's largest mobile operator with three million customers and a market share of 37.8 percent (2015). Tigo is also El Salvador's largest broadband and cable service provider and offers satellite DTH services, mobile financial services under the brand Tigo Money, as well as corporate and B2B services. Millicom equity holding is 100 percent. (Q1 2014)

Honduras 
Tigo launched in 2004 to replace the former national brand CELTEL. It is now the leading mobile service provider in a country of eight million, with an estimated 4.8 million customers. Its mobile market share is placed at 66 percent. Tigo Honduras also offers broadband, cable, business, satellite, and financial services. Millicom equity holding is 66.7 percent.

Paraguay 
Millicom provides mobile and cable and other fixed services in Paraguay through various subsidiaries which it fully owns. Millicom has operated in Paraguay since 1992 and is now the largest mobile operator with 3.8 million subscribers from a population of 6.7 million (World Bank 2012). Tigo Home has become market leader for pay TV and fixed broadband services since its launch in 2014, alongside Millicom's first DTH satellite service. Tigo's mobile market share is 56.4 percent. Tigo Paraguay has exclusive rights to broadcast Paraguay’s national league championship games through 2023, and has exclusive sponsorship rights in telecommunications for the Paraguayan National Soccer Team through 2023. Millicom equity holding is 100 percent.

Exclusive Channels of Tigo TV Paraguay

Tigo Sports 
Launched in 1994 as a Pay TV Channel and Digital sports content provider, this was the first sports media launched in all operations in Millicom. Originally known as Teledeportes Paraguay, a sports producing company that evolved into broadcast of events and programs 24/7. Its headquarters named "Tigo Sports Media House" is based in Fernando de la Mora and is among the best equipped studios in the region with 2 studios of 400 sq mts. Tigo Sports owns its own fleet of OB Vans and has over 150 employees.

Sports rights that were part of the grid included:

 NBA (Shared with PSN, ESPN, Bein Sports, DIRECTV Sports and NBA TV, seasons 1998/99, 2015/16 and 2016/17)
 Serie A (Shared with PSN, Bein Sports, DIRECTV Sports and Claro Sports, seasons 2014/15 and 2015–16)
 Premier League (Shared with ESPN, Bein Sports, DIRECTV Sports and Claro Sports, seasons 2014/15 and 2015/16)
 FIFA World Cup Brazil 2014
 Copa America Chile 2015 (Shared with Bein Sports & DIRECTV Sports)
 Copa America Centenario (USA) 2016
 FIFA World Cup Russia 2018

Tigo Max 
Launched in 1992 as a pay-per-view channel

Sportive events of Tigo Max

 Paraguayan Primera Division
 División Intermedia
 Paraguayan Basketball League
 TC 2000

Tigo Music

Tigo SAT Network 
Launched in January 1995 as a 24-hour variety Pay TV channel.

Telenovelas broadcast on Tigo SAT Network

 O Rei do Gado
 Terra Nostra
 Mi pequeña traviesa
 Café con aroma de mujer

Unicanal 
Unicanal was a 24-hour Pay TV cable purchased in October 2012 by the merger with Cablevision Paraguay (property of Grupo Clarin Argentina). It began operations on 15 December 1989, when it started broadcasting at 5:45 AM. During its time as propriety of Tigo Paraguay, genres included in the grid included News, Entertainment, Realities, Health, Magazines, alternating between local content and Argentinian content provided by El Trece Argentina (also part of Grupo Clarin) In February 2014, local soccer broadcast was translated from Unicanal to Tigo's new Pay TV cable, Tigo Sports, dedicated to sports 24/7. In February 2015, Tigo sold the operations of Unicanal to JBB Group, a company owner of Radio Disney, specialized in media, entertainment, distribution and in real estate.

Nicaragua 
In 2019, Millicom purchased Telefonía Celular de Nicaragua, S.A. ("Telefonía Nicaragua"), the leading provider of Mobile services in the country, based on the number of subscribers. As of December 31, 2020, Millicom served 3.5 million mobile subscribers in the country through its Tigo brand. Prior to 2019, Millicom had a very small presence in Nicaragua, where it provided mostly B2B fixed services. Since 2018, Tigo Nicaragua Millicom has also provided cable services to a small but rapidly-growing customer base.

Costa Rica 
Tigo Costa Rica is the country's leading pay TV operator with more than 30 years of service under different brand names dating back to Millicom's acquisition of Amnet in 2008.

Bolivia 
Millicom provides mobile and cable and other fixed services in Bolivia through TELECEL (a native Bolivian brand) which it fully owns and operates under the Tigo brand. Tigo Bolivia is now the second largest mobile operator in Bolivia (population 10.5 million – World Bank 2012) with more than 3.9 million customers. Tigo Bolivia competes with Entel and Nuevatel PCS (under the brand name Viva). Branded services include Tigo Money, Tigo Star and Tigo Sports, Tigo Business and Tigo Smart. In 2014, Bolivia launched Millicom's first satellite DTH service. Millicom equity holding is 100 percent.

Colombia 
Tigo Colombia launched in 2006 and is Colombia's third largest mobile service provider with more than ten million customers. Its services include Tigo Money and UNE internet and broadband, with significant further market penetration anticipated in 2014 following a Merger Framework Agreement signed in 2013 with UNE EPM Telecomunicaciones, of the Empresas Publicas de Medellin group. Millicom also has a growing portfolio online in retail and services. Equity holding is 50 percent plus one share.

Exclusive Channels of Tigo Colombia include Tigo Sports. It was first launched on 7 April 2014. The Colombian Second Sports Channel with sports broadcasting rights including: Categoria Primera C (seven games per match day), Copa Colombia (three matches per round), Premier League (up to six games per match day), Greek Super League (four games per match day).

Panama 
Millicom purchased 80% of Cable Onda, a Panamanian cable TV provider and ISP for US$1460 Million, in October 2018. It phased out the Cable Onda brand in 2020, replacing it with its Tigo brand. In February 2019 Tigo announced the purchase of the Panamanian, Costa Rican and Nicaraguan operations of the Spanish company Telefónica for US$650 Million, US$570 Million, and US$430 Million respectively, totaling US$1650 Million, with Tigo planning to phase out the Movistar brand (operated by Telefónica) from those markets within a year after its purchase. The transaction was completed in August the same year.

As of March 2021, Millicom maintains operations across nine Latin American countries: Bolivia, Colombia, Costa Rica, El Salvador, Guatemala, Honduras, Nicaragua, Panama and Paraguay.

Africa 
Millicom (TIGO) previously held operations in Chad, Democratic Republic of the Congo, Ghana, Mauritius, Rwanda, Senegal, Sierra Leone, and Tanzania.

 Millicom (TIGO) completed the sale of Sierra Leone in 2009.
 Millicom (TIGO) completed the sale of Mauritius in 2014.
 Millicom (TIGO) completed the sale of Democratic Republic of the Congo in 2016.
 Millicom (TIGO) and Bharti Airtel merged in Ghana to complete AirtelTigo in 2017.
 Millicom (TIGO) completed the sale of Rwanda in 2017.
 Millicom (TIGO) completed the sale of Chad in 2019.
 Millicom (TIGO) completed the sale of Senegal in 2019.
 Millicom (TIGO) completed the sale of Tanzania in 2021.

See also 

 List of telephone operating companies
 List of mobile network operators

References

External links
 
Tigo
 Tigo Website
 Tigo Bolivia
 Tigo Colombia
 Tigo Costa Rica
 Tigo El Salvador
 Tigo Guatemala
 Tigo Honduras
 Tigo Nicaragua
 Tigo Panama
 Tigo Paraguay

Mobile phone companies of Luxembourg
Telecommunications companies established in 1990
Companies based in Stockholm
Companies based in Luxembourg City
Companies listed on Nasdaq Stockholm
Swedish companies established in 1990